Lactarius lazulinus is a member of the large milk-cap genus Lactarius in the order Russulales. It was first described scientifically in 2007.

See also

List of Lactarius species

References

External links

lazulinus
Fungi described in 2007